Invention USA is an American reality television series on the History channel that debuted on December 9, 2011. The series features inventor and technologist Reichart Von Wolfsheild and Scotty Ziegler (replacing theoretical physicist Garrett Lisi) as they travel around America to oversee the work of amateur inventors.  Season 2 premiered on November 26, 2012.

Episodes

Season 1 (2011)

Season 2 (2012)

See also
 Everyday Edisons,  an American reality television series on PBS

References

External links
 

2011 American television series debuts
2010s American reality television series
History (American TV channel) original programming
Open innovation intermediaries
2012 American television series endings